The Bundeswehr (meaning literally: Federal Defence) is the armed forces of the Federal Republic of Germany. The Bundeswehr is divided into a military part (armed forces or Streitkräfte) and a civil part, the military part consisting of the German Army, the German Navy, the German Air Force, the Joint Support Service, the Joint Medical Service, and the Cyber and Information Domain Service.

, the Bundeswehr had a strength of 183,638 active-duty military personnel and 81,318 civilians, placing it among the 30 largest military forces in the world, and making it the second largest in the European Union behind France. In addition, the Bundeswehr has approximately 30,050 reserve personnel (2020). With German military expenditures at $56.0 billion, the Bundeswehr is the seventh highest-funded military in the world, though military expenditures remain relatively average at 1.3% of national GDP,  well below the non-binding NATO target of 2%. Germany is aiming to expand the Bundeswehr to around 203,000 soldiers by 2025 to better cope with increasing responsibilities.

Following concerns from the 2022 Russian invasion of Ukraine, Germany announced a major shift in policy, pledging a €100 billion special fund for the Bundeswehrto remedy years of underinvestmentalong with raising the budget to above 2% GDP.

History

Founding principles 

The name Bundeswehr was first proposed by former Wehrmacht general and Liberal politician Hasso von Manteuffel. The Iron Cross (Eisernes Kreuz), a symbol that has a long association with the military of Germany, is its official emblem. The Schwarzes Kreuz is derived from the black cross insignia of the medieval Teutonic knights; since 1813 the symbol has been used to denote a military decoration for all ranks.

When the Bundeswehr was established in 1955, its founding principles were based on developing a completely new military force for the defence of West Germany. In this respect the Bundeswehr did not consider itself to be a successor to either the Reichswehr (1921–1935) of the Weimar Republic or Hitler's Wehrmacht (1935–1946), and did not adhere to the traditions of any former German military organization. Its official ethos is based on three major themes:
 the aims of the military reformers at the beginning of the 19th century such as Scharnhorst, Gneisenau, and Clausewitz
 the conduct displayed by members of the military resistance against Adolf Hitler, especially the attempt of Claus von Stauffenberg and Henning von Tresckow to assassinate him.
 its own tradition since 1955.

One of the most visible traditions of the modern Bundeswehr is the Großer Zapfenstreich. This is a form of military tattoo that has its origins in the landsknecht era. The FRG reinstated this formal military ceremony in 1952, three years before the foundation of the Bundeswehr. Today it is performed by a military band with 4 fanfare trumpeters and timpani, a corps of drums, up to two escort companies of the Bundeswehr'''s Wachbataillon (or another deputized unit) and Torchbearers. The Zapfenstreich is only performed during national celebrations or solemn public commemorations. It can honour distinguished persons present such as the German federal president, or provide the conclusion to large military exercises.

Another important tradition in the modern German armed forces is the Gelöbnis: the solemn oath made by serving professional soldiers, and recruits (and formerly conscripts) during basic training. There are two kinds of oath: a pledge for recruits, and a solemn vow for full-time personnel.

The pledge is made annually on 20 July, the date on which a group of Wehrmacht officers attempted to assassinate Adolf Hitler in 1944. Recruits from the Bundeswehr's Wachbataillon make their vow (Gelöbnis) at the Bendlerblock in Berlin. This was the headquarters of the resistance and also where the officers were summarily executed following the failure of the attempt. National commemorations are held nearby within the grounds of the Reichstag. Similar events also take place across the German Republic. Since 2011, when conscription was suspended, the wording of the ceremonial vow for full-time recruits and volunteer personnel is:

"Ich gelobe, der Bundesrepublik Deutschland treu zu dienen und das Recht und die Freiheit des deutschen Volkes tapfer zu verteidigen."

Serving Bundeswehr personnel replace "Ich gelobe, ..." with "Ich schwöre, ..." ("I swear...").

 Cold War: 1955–1990 

After World War II the responsibility for the security of Germany as a whole rested with the four Allied Powers: the United States, the United Kingdom, France and the Soviet Union. Germany had been without armed forces since the Wehrmacht was dissolved following World War II. When the Federal Republic of Germany was founded in 1949, it was without a military. Germany remained completely demilitarized and any plans for a German military were forbidden by Allied regulations. 

Some naval mine-sweeping units continued to exist, but they remained unarmed and under Allied control and did not serve as a national defence force. The Federal Border Protection Force, a mobile, lightly armed police force of 10,000 men, was formed on 14 March 1951 and expanded to 20,000 men on 19 June 1953. A proposal to integrate West German troops with soldiers of France, Belgium, the Netherlands, Luxembourg and Italy in a European Defence Community was proposed but never implemented.

There was a discussion among the United States, the United Kingdom and France over the issue of a revived (West) German military. In particular, France was reluctant to allow Germany to rearm in light of recent history (Germany had invaded France twice in living memory, in World War I and World War II, and also defeated France in the Franco-Prussian War of 1870/71). However, after the project for a European Defence Community failed in the French National Assembly in 1954, France agreed to West German accession to NATO and rearmament.

With growing tensions between the Soviet Union and the West, especially after the Korean War, this policy was to be revised. While the German Democratic Republic (East Germany) was already secretly rearming, the seeds of a new West German force started in 1950 when former high-ranking German officers were tasked by Chancellor Konrad Adenauer to discuss the options for West German rearmament. The results of a meeting in the monastery of Himmerod formed the conceptual base to build the new armed forces in West Germany. 

The Amt Blank (Blank Agency, named after its director Theodor Blank), the predecessor of the later Federal Ministry of Defence, was formed the same year to prepare the establishment of the future forces. Hasso von Manteuffel, a former general of the Wehrmacht and Free Democratic Party politician, submitted the name Bundeswehr for the new forces. This name was later confirmed by the West German Bundestag.

The Bundeswehr was officially established on the 200th birthday of Scharnhorst on 12 November 1955. In personnel and education terms, the most important initial feature of the new German armed forces was to be their orientation as citizen defenders of a democratic state, fully subordinate to the political leadership of the country. A personnel screening committee was created to make sure that the future colonels and generals of the armed forces were those whose political attitude and experience would be acceptable to the new democratic state. There were a few key reformers, such as General Ulrich de Maiziere, General Graf von Kielmansegg, and Graf von Baudissin, who reemphasised some of the more democratic parts of Germany's armed forces history in order to establish a solid civil-military basis to build upon.

After an amendment of the Basic Law in 1955, West Germany became a member of NATO. The first public military review took place at Andernach, in January 1956. A US Military Assistance Advisory Group (MAAG) helped with the introduction of the Bundeswehrs initial equipment and war material, predominantly of American origin. In 1956, conscription for all men between the ages of 18 and 45 was reintroduced, later augmented by a civil alternative with longer duration (see Conscription in Germany). In response, East Germany formed its own military force, the Nationale Volksarmee (NVA), in 1956, with conscription being established only in 1962. The Nationale Volksarmee was eventually dissolved with the reunification of Germany in 1990. Compulsory conscription was suspendedbut not completely abolished as an alternativein January 2011.

During the Cold War the Bundeswehr was the backbone of NATO's conventional defence in Central Europe. It had a strength of 495,000 military and 170,000 civilian personnel. Although Germany had smaller armed forces than France and the United States, Cold War Historian John Lewis Gaddis assesses the Bundeswehr as "perhaps world's best army". The Army consisted of three corps with 12 divisions, most of them heavily armed with tanks and APCs. The Luftwaffe owned significant numbers of tactical combat aircraft and took part in NATO's integrated air defence (NATINAD). The Navy was tasked and equipped to defend the Baltic Approaches, to provide escort reinforcement and resupply shipping in the North Sea and to contain the Soviet Baltic Fleet.

During this time the Bundeswehr did not take part in combat operations. However, there were a number of large-scale training exercises resulting in operational casualties. The first such incident was in June 1957, when 15 paratroop recruits drowned in the Iller river, Bavaria.

 German Reunification 1990 
At the time of reunification, the German military boasted a manpower of some 585,000 soldiers. As part of the German reunification process, under the Treaty on the Final Settlement with Respect to Germany (Two-Plus Four Treaty), which paved the way for reunification, the Bundeswehr was to be reduced to 370,000 personnel, of whom no more than 345,000 were to be in the Army and Air Force. This would be Germany's contribution to the Treaty on Conventional Armed Forces in Europe, and the restrictions would enter into force at the time the CFE treaty would. As a result, the Bundeswehr was significantly reduced, and the former East German Nationale Volksarmee (NVA) was disbanded, with a portion of its personnel and material being absorbed into the Bundeswehr.

About 50,000 Volksarmee personnel were integrated into the Bundeswehr on 2 October 1990. This figure was rapidly reduced as conscripts and short-term volunteers completed their service. A number of senior officers (but no generals or admirals) received limited contracts for up to two years to continue daily operations. Personnel remaining in the Bundeswehr were awarded new contracts and new ranks, dependent on their individual qualification and experience. Many were granted and accepted a lower rank than previously held in the Volksarmee.

In general, the unification process of the two militariesunder the slogan "Armee der Einheit" (or "Army of Unity")has been seen publicly as a major success and an example for other parts of the society.

With the reduction, a large amount of the military hardware of the Bundeswehr, as well as of the Volksarmee, had to be disposed of. Most of the armoured vehicles and fighter jet aircraft (the Bundesluftwaffedue to reunificationwas the only air force in the world that flew both Phantoms and MIGs) were dismantled under international disarmament procedures. Many ships were scrapped or sold, often to the Baltic states or Indonesia (the latter received 39 former Volksmarine vessels of various types).

With reunification, all restrictions on the manufacture and possession of conventional arms that had been imposed on the Bundeswehr as a condition for West German rearmament were lifted.

Since 1996, Germany also has its own special forces, the Kommando Spezialkräfte (Special Forces Command). It was formed after German citizens had to be rescued from the Rwandan genocide by Belgian Para-Commandos as the Special Commands of the Federal Police were not capable of operating in a war zone.

 Reorientation 

A major event for the German military was a series of defense spending cuts and the suspension of the compulsory conscription for men in 2011. These were introduced by Chancellor Angela Merkel and Finance Minister Wolfgang Schäuble as part of austerity measures in response to the Great Recession and the European debt crisis. In 2011/12, a major reform of the Bundeswehr was announced under Thomas de Maizière, further limiting the number of military bases and soldiers. The land forces of the Bundeswehr would have three large units at divisional level. There are currently five. The number of brigades decreased from eleven to eight.

German military expenditures are lower than comparable countries of the European Union such as France and the United Kingdom, especially when taking into account Germany's larger population and economy. This discrepancy is often criticized by Germany's NATO allies, as far back as Obama-era US Secretary of Defense Robert M. Gates.

As one result of the 2014 NATO Wales summit which was attended by both Merkel and Ursula von der Leyen in September 2014, the Bundeswehr acknowledged in October chronic equipment problems that rendered its armed forces "unable to deliver its defensive NATO promises". Among the problems cited were dysfunctional weapons systems, armored vehicles, aircraft, and naval vessels unfit for immediate service due to a neglect of maintenance, and serious equipment and spare parts shortages. The situation was so dire in 2016 that it was acknowledged that most of Germany's fighter aircraft and combat helicopters were not in deployable condition, although the Air Force had almost 38,000 soldiers, and von der Leyen's daycare system to boot.Justin Huggler (12 September 2014), After army crèches and cosy barracks, Germany has new idea for troops – shorter working hours The Daily Telegraph.

In 2015, as a result of the Annexation of Crimea by the Russian Federation, Germany announced what was termed "a major increase" in defense spending. In May 2015, the German government approved an increase in defense spending, at the time 1.3% of GDP, by 6.2% over the following five years, allowing the Ministry of Defense to fully modernize the army. The 2015 reform set a required strength of 185,000 soldiers. Plans were also announced to significantly expand the tank fleet to a potential number of 328, order 131 more Boxer armored personnel carriers, increase the submarine fleet, and to develop a new fighter jet to replace the Panavia Tornado. Germany considered increasing the size of the army, and in May 2016 it announced it would spend €130 billion on new equipment by 2030 and add nearly 7,000 soldiers by 2023 in the first German military expansion since the end of the Cold War. In February 2017, the German government announced another expansion, which would increase the number of its professional soldiers by 20,000 by 2024.

 Coordination with European Partners 
As a consequence of improved Dutch-German cooperation, since 2014 two of the three Royal Netherlands Army Brigades are under German Command. In 2014, the 11th Airmobile Brigade was integrated into the German Division of fast forces (DSK). The Dutch 43rd Mechanized Brigade will be assigned to the 1st Panzer Division of the German army, with the integration starting at the beginning of 2016, and the unit becoming operational at the end of 2019. In February 2016 it was announced that the Seebatallion of the German Navy would start to operate under Royal Dutch Navy command. The Dutch-German military cooperation was seen in 2016 by von der Leyen and Dutch Minister of Defence Jeanine Hennis-Plasschaert as an example for setting up a European defense union.

According to a policy dictated by von der Leyen in February 2017, the Bundeswehr is to play a greater role as "anchor army" for smaller NATO states, by improving coordination between its divisions and smaller members' Brigades.

A further proposal by Minister of Defence Ursula von der Leyen, to allow non-German EU nationals to join the Bundeswehr, was met in July 2016 by strong opposition, even from her own party.

It was announced in February 2017 that the Czech Republic's 4th Rapid Deployment Brigade and Romania's 81st Mechanized Brigade would be integrated into Germany's 10 Armoured Division and Rapid Response Forces Division.

Consequences of 2022 Russian invasion of Ukraine
, the number of active military personnel in the Bundeswehr was 183.051. Military expenditure in Germany was at $52.8 billion in 2020.

At the end of February 2022, in light of Russia's invasion of Ukraine, chancellor Olaf Scholz announced a plan to increase the power of the German military, pledging €100 billion ($112.7 billion) of the 2022 budget for the armed forces and repeating his promise to reach the 2% of gross domestic product spending on defense in line with (as editorialized by Deutsche Welle) NATO "demands".

According to information from defense politicians of the federal German parliament, representatives of the armaments industry and other experts, in October 2022 the Bundeswehr only had enough ammunition in stock for one or two days during wartime.

A report made by the Ministry of Defence revealed problems in the Bundeswehr such as limited preparedness and lack of equipment. In the letter accompanying the report which was sent to the federal German parliament, the Minister of Defence noted that the situation would improve but "closing the gaps takes time".

 Command organisation 
 History of organisation 
With the growing number of missions abroad it was recognized that the Bundeswehr required a new command structure. A reform commission under the chairmanship of the former President Richard von Weizsäcker presented its recommendations in spring 2000.

In October 2000 the Joint Support Service, the Streitkräftebasis, was established to concentrate logistics and other supporting functions such as military police, supply and communications under one command. Medical support was reorganised with the establishment of the Joint Medical Service. In 2016, the Bundeswehr created its youngest branch the Cyber and Information Space Command.

 Senior leadership 
The Minister of Defence is supported by the Chief of Defense (CHOD, Generalinspekteur) and the service chiefs (Inspekteure: Inspector of the Army, Inspector of the Air Force, Inspector of the Navy) and their respective staffs in his or her function as commander-in-chief. The CHOD and the service chiefs form the Military Command Council (Militärischer Führungsrat) with functions similar to those of the Joint Chiefs of Staff in the United States. Subordinate to the CHOD is the Armed Forces Operational Command (Einsatzführungskommando). For smaller missions one of the service HQs (e.g. the Fleet Command) may exercise command and control of forces in missions abroad. The Bundestag must approve any foreign deployment by a simple majority. This has led to some discontent with Germany's allies about troop deployments e.g. in Afghanistan since parliamentary consent over such issues is relatively hard to achieve in Germany.

 Combat forces 
The combat forces of the Army are organised into three combat divisions and participate in multi-national command structures at the corps level. The Air Force maintains three divisions and the Navy is structured into two flotillas. The Joint Support Service and the Joint Medical Service are both organized in four regional commands of identical structure. All of these services also have general commands for training, procurement, and other general issues.

 Operational Command 
The Armed Forces Operational Command (Einsatzführungskommando der Bundeswehr) is the only joint military command of the Bundeswehr. It controls all abroad running missions. The command is located near Potsdam and is headed by a Generalleutnant (3-star-general).

 Mission 

The role of the Bundeswehr is described in the Constitution of Germany (Art. 87a) as absolutely defensive only. Its only active role before 1990 was the Katastropheneinsatz (disaster control). Within the Bundeswehr, it helped after natural disasters both in Germany and abroad. After 1990, the international situation changed from East-West confrontation to one of general uncertainty and instability.

After a ruling of the Federal Constitutional Court in 1994 the term "defence" has been defined to not only include protection of the borders of Germany, but also crisis reaction and conflict prevention, or more broadly as guarding the security of Germany anywhere in the world. According to the definition given by Defence Minister Peter Struck (2002 to 2005), it may be necessary to defend Germany even at the Hindu Kush. This requires the Bundeswehr to take part in operations outside of the borders of Germany, as part of NATO or the European Union and mandated by the UN.

 Operations 
Since the early 1990s the Bundeswehr has become more and more engaged in international operations in and around the former Yugoslavia, and also in other parts of the world like Cambodia or Somalia. After the 11 September 2001 attacks, German forces were employed in most related theaters except Iraq.

Currently (4 April 2022) there are 2,107 Bundeswehr soldiers deployed in:
 
KFOR
 70 personnel
 
UNMISS
 14 personnel
 
UNIFIL
 62 personnel
 
EUTM Mali
 325 personnel
 MINUSMA
 1,112 personnel
 Horn of Africa / Indian Ocean
Operation Atalanta
 5 personnel
 Mediterranean Sea
 Operation Sea Guardian
 195 personnel
 Mediterranean Sea
 Operation Irini
 15 personnel
  / 
 Operation Counter Daesh
 255 personnel
 Western Sahara
 MINURSO
 3 personnel

In addition to the numbers above, 51 soldiers are on permanent stand-by for medical evacuation operations around the world in assistance of ongoing German or coalition operations (STRATAIRMEDEVAC).

In support of Allied stabilization efforts in Iraq, the Bundeswehr is also training the new Iraqi security forces in locations outside Iraq, such as the United Arab Emirates and Germany.

Since 1994, the Bundeswehr has lost about 100 troops in foreign deployments, including in Afghanistan.

 Equipment 

According to the new threat scenario facing Germany and its NATO allies, the Bundeswehr is currently reorganising itself. To realise growth in mobility and the enlargement of the air force's capabilities, the Bundeswehr is going to buy 53 Airbus A400M transports as well as additional Eurofighter Typhoon fighters, F35 fighters and also several unmanned aerial vehicle models. NH90 helicopters (49 of them in the naval version) are being delivered while a new heavy transport helicopter is being planned. 

For the ground forces it plans to procure 579 Puma infantry fighting vehicles, at least 503 Boxer MRAV, started to introduce a novel land soldier system and a new generation of transportation vehicles and light vehicles, such as the Fennek, and Mowag Eagle. Further, the German Navy is going to build 4-6 new F126 class frigates, new spy ships, support vessels and additional Type 212 submarines in an enlarged version.

 Appearance 
 Uniforms 

The service uniform is theoretically the standard type of Bundeswehr uniform for general duty and off-post activity, but is most associated with ceremonial occasions. The army's service uniform consists of a light gray, single-breasted coat and darker grey trousers, worn with a light blue shirt, black tie, and black shoes. The peaked, visored cap has been replaced by the beret as the most common form of headgear. Dress uniforms featuring dinner jackets or double-breasted coats are worn by officers for various social occasions. 

The battle and work uniform consists of Flecktarn camouflage fatigues, which are also worn on field duty. In practice, they are also used for general duty and off-post at least at barracks where there is also field duty even by others, and for the way home or to the post, and generally regarded as the Heer uniform. In all three services, light sand-coloured uniforms are available for duty in warmer climates. In 2016 a new Multitarn pattern was launched, similar to the MultiCam uniforms of the British Army or US Army.

A different, traditional variety of the service uniform is worn by the Gebirgsjäger (mountain infantry), consisting of ski jacket, stretch trousers, and ski boots. Instead of the beret, they wear the grey "mountain cap". The field uniform is the same, except for the (optional) metal Edelweiss worn on the forage cap.

The traditional arm-of-service colours appear as lapel facings and as piping on shoulder straps. Generals wear an inner piping of gold braid; other officers wear silver piping. Lapel facings and piping are maroon for general staff, green for infantry, red for artillery, pink for armour, black for engineers, yellow for communications, dark yellow for reconnaissance and various other colors for the remaining branches. Combat troops wear green (infantry), black (armour), or maroon (airborne) berets. Logistics troops and combat support troops, such as artillery or engineers, wear red berets. A gold or silver badge on the beret denotes the individual branch of service.

The naval forces wear the traditional navy blue, double-breasted coat and trousers; enlisted personnel wear either a white shirt or a navy blue shirt with the traditional navy collar. White uniforms provide an alternative for summer. The officer's dress cap is mounted with a gold anchor surrounded by a wreath. The visor of the admiral's cap bears a double row of oak leaves. U-boat captains wear the traditional white hat.

The air force service uniform consists of a blue jacket and trousers with a light blue shirt, dark blue tie, and black shoes. Olive battle dress similar to the army fatigue uniform is worn in basic training and during other field duty. Flying personnel wear wings on their right breast. Other air force personnel wear a modified wing device with a symbol in its centre denoting service specialisation. These Tätigkeitsabzeichen come in bronze, silver, or gold, depending on one's length of service in the specialty. Wings, superimposed over a wreath, in gold, silver, or bronze, depending on rank, are also worn on the service or field cap.

 Ranks 

In general, officer ranks are those used in the Prussian and pre-1945 German armies. Officer rank insignia are worn on shoulder straps or shoulder boards. Army (Heer) and air force (Luftwaffe) junior officers' insignia are four pointed silver stars while field grade officers wear silver (black or white on camouflage uniforms) stars and an oak wreath around the lowest star. The stars and wreath are gold for general officers. In the case of naval (Marine) officers, rank is indicated by gold stripes on the lower sleeve of the blue service jacket and on shoulder boards of the white uniform.

Soldier and NCO ranks are similar to those of the Prussian and pre-1945 German armies. In the army and air force, a Gefreiter corresponds to the NATO rank OR-2 and Obergefreiter as well as Hauptgefreiter to OR-3, while OR-4 stands for Stabsgefreiter and Oberstabsgefreiter. An Unteroffizier is the lowest-ranking sergeant (OR-5), followed by Stabsunteroffizier (also OR-5), Feldwebel and Oberfeldwebel (OR-6), Hauptfeldwebel (OR-7/8), Stabsfeldwebel (OR-8) and Oberstabsfeldwebel (OR-9). Ranks of army and air force enlisted personnel are designated by stripes, chevrons, and "sword knots" worn on rank slides. 

Naval enlisted rank designations are worn on the upper (OR 1–5) or lower (OR-6 and above) sleeve along with a symbol based on an anchor for the service specialization (rating). Army and air force officer candidates hold the separate ranks of Fahnenjunker (OR-5), Fähnrich (OR-6) and Oberfähnrich (OR-7/8), and wear the appropriate rank insignia plus a silver cord bound around it. Officers candidates in the navy Seekadett (sea cadet; equivalent to OR-5) and Fähnrich zur See (midshipman second class; OR-6) wear the rank insignia of the respective enlisted ranks but with a gold star instead of the rating symbol, while an Oberfähnrich zur See (midshipman first class; OR-7/8) wears an officer type thin rank stripe.

Medical personnel of all three services wear a version of the traditional caduceus (staff with entwined serpents) on their shoulder straps or sleeve. The officers' ranks have own designations differing from the line officers, the rank insignias however are basically the same.

 Women 

Women have served in the medical service since 1975. From 1993 they were also allowed to serve as enlisted personnel and non-commissioned officers in the medical service and the army bands. In 2000, in a lawsuit brought up by Tanja Kreil, the European Court of Justice issued a ruling allowing women to serve in more roles than previously allowed. Since 2001 they can serve in all functions of service without restriction, but they are not subject to conscription. There are presently around 23,066 women on active duty and a number of female reservists who take part in all duties including peacekeeping missions and other operations. In 1994, Verena von Weymarn became Generalarzt der Luftwaffe (Surgeon General of the Air Force), the first woman ever to reach the rank of general in the armed forces of Germany.

For women, lower physical performance requirements are required in the basic fitness test, which must be completed at the time of recruitment and later on annually.

 Rank structure 

Officers

NCOs and enlisted

 Recruitment 
With the suspension of compulsory military service in 2011 and the reorientation of the Bundeswehr, the military district recruiting offices were dissolved effective 30 November 2012. Their tasks were taken over by the newly created career centers of the Bundeswehr.
The career centers of the Bundeswehr are the armed forces main way of presenting itself as a nationwide employer for both military and civilian careers.

In the structure of the Bundeswehr's personnel recruitment organization adopted in 2019, there are five large career centers in Hanover, Mainz, Düsseldorf, Munich and Berlin with assessment centers. There are 16 smaller, regional career centers, of which only those in Wilhelmshaven, Stuttgart and Erfurt have an assessment center. The 110 career counseling offices belonging to the career centers are combined with 86 location teams of the career development service to form 113 counseling offices.
The Bundeswehr offers numerous career paths:

 Voluntary military service (FWD) in Germany is an employment relationship for soldiers in a career of the lower rank Bundeswehr personnel. It lasts at least 7 and at most 23 months. Its legal status is similar to that of conscripts.
 A temporary soldier (abbreviated SaZ, colloquially called Zeitsoldat) is a soldier who voluntarily agrees to perform military service for a limited time. A SaZ can enter all three categories (enlisted, non-commissioned officers and officers). SaZ recruited as NCOs and officers undergo general military, career and specialty training. The regular commitment period is a minimum of 2 and a maximum of 25 years, but may not extend beyond the age of 62.
 Career in the Reserve: There are multiple career paths in the reserve of the armed forces for officers, NCOs, and enlisted personnel, as well as for civilians who have no prior military training.

 Awards 

 Badge of Honour of the Bundeswehr
 Combat Action Medal of the Bundeswehr
 German Armed Forces Badge of Marksmanship
 German Armed Forces Badge for Military Proficiency
 German Armed Forces Service Medal
 German Flood Service Medal (2002)
 German Flood Service Medal (2013)
 German Parachutist Badge

 See also 

 Controversy over Erwin Rommel as Bundeswehr's role model
 Day X plot, alleged conspiracy of Bundeswehr soldiers to murder left-leaning politicians
 Defence Force
 List of military equipment of Germany
 Myth of the clean Wehrmacht
 Order of Merit of the Federal Republic of Germany
 Reichswehr
 United Nations Training Center of the Bundeswehr
 Wehrmacht

References
 

Further reading
 
 Seppo, Antti (2021). From Guilt to Responsibility and Beyond: The Evolution of German Strategic Culture after the End of the Cold War. Berlin: Berliner Wissenschafts-Verlag. .  
 Stengel, Frank A. (2020). The Politics of Military Force: Antimilitarism, Ideational Change, and Post-Cold War German Security Discourse. Ann Arbor, MI: University of Michigan Press. .

External links

 Bundeswehr'' official site
 Federal Ministry of Defence official site (in German, English and French)
 Bundesamt für Wehrtechnik und Beschaffung official site (in German)
 Bundesamt für Informationsmanagement und Informationstechnik der Bundeswehr official site (in German)
 Territoriale Wehrverwaltung official site (in German)
 Y – Magazine of the Federal Defence Forces (in German)
 Zeitschrift für Innere Führung (in German)
 Reader Sicherheitspolitik (in German)

 
 

Articles containing video clips
 
Military history of Germany
Permanent Structured Cooperation